Al-Majd Sports Club is a Syrian football club based in Damascus, Syria. The club is insignificant compared to the city rival  Al-Wahda, but more popular than the other rival Al-Jaish.

History
The club was founded in 1932 under the name of Damascus Al-Ahly Club, and is one of the oldest football clubs in Damascus and the whole country. The club's greatest success is the Syrian cup victory in the 1960/61 and 1977/78 season. 

At the end of the 2007/08 season of Premier League, the club was runner-up and thus achieved its highest ranking in the league at all. As a runner-up in the league, they automatically qualified for the AFC Cup 2009.

The biggest success of the club in recent years is the final of the Syrian Cup from the 2019/20 season.

The club played in the country's second highest league, the Syrian League 1st Division after relegating from the Premier League in the 2018/2019 season. In the 2021-22 season, after winning the double match against Hurriya SC, when they won 2-1 in the first match and drew 1-1 in the second, they advanced to the Syrian Premier League.

Stadium

The club plays its home games in the Abbasiyyin Stadium.

Honours
Syrian Premier League
Runner-up : 2008
Syrian Cup: 2
Winner : 1961, 1978
Runner-up : 1964, 2006, 2009, 2020
United Arab Republic Cup:
Runner-up : 1961
Syrian Super Cup:
Runner-up : 2008
AFC Cup:
Round of 16 : 2009
Arab Champions League:
Quarter-final : 2008
Damascus International Championship: 1
Winner : 2009

Performance in AFC competitions

Current squad

Former managers

 Tahseen Jabbary (2009)
 Emad Dahbour (2011-12)

Notable former players

 Ali Diab
 Hamzeh Al Aitoni
 Samer Awad 
 Ali Al Rifai
  Mohamed Al-Zeno
 Oko Bota
 Junior

References

Majd
Sport in Damascus
Association football clubs established in 1932
1932 establishments in Mandatory Syria

External links
Official page